Cuando llega el amor ("When love arrives") is a special album from the telenovela of the same name, starred by Lucero and Omar Fierro. This album consists of three previously released songs and a new song "Cuando llega el amor", theme from the soap opera. It was released in 1990.

Track listing
 Cuando Llega El Amor
 Vete Con Ella
 Cuéntame
 Millones Mejor Que Tú

Singles

References

1990 albums
Lucero (entertainer) soundtracks